Santa Isabel Canton is a canton of Ecuador, located in the Azuay Province.  Its capital is the town of Santa Isabel.  Its population at the 2001 census was 18,015.

Demographics
Ethnic groups as of the Ecuadorian census of 2010:
Mestizo  92.5%
White  4.4%
Afro-Ecuadorian  2.2%
Indigenous  0.5%
Montubio  0.2%
Other  0.2%

References

Cantons of Azuay Province